The BH3 interacting-domain death agonist, or BID, gene is a pro-apoptotic member of the Bcl-2 protein family. Bcl-2 family members share one or more of the four characteristic domains of homology entitled the Bcl-2 homology (BH) domains (named BH1, BH2, BH3 and BH4), and can form hetero- or homodimers. Bcl-2 proteins act as anti- or pro-apoptotic regulators that are involved in a wide variety of cellular activities.

Interactions
BID is a pro-apoptotic Bcl-2 protein containing only the BH3 domain. In response to apoptotic signaling, BID interacts with another Bcl-2 family protein, Bax, leading to the insertion of Bax into organelle membranes, primarily the outer mitochondrial membrane.  Bax is believed to interact with, and induce the opening of the mitochondrial voltage-dependent anion channel, VDAC. Alternatively, growing evidence suggest that activated Bax and/or Bak form an oligomeric pore, MAC in the outer membrane.  This results in the release of cytochrome c and other pro-apoptotic factors (such as SMAC/DIABLO) from the mitochondria, often referred to as mitochondrial outer membrane permeabilization, leading to activation of caspases. This defines BID as a direct activator of Bax, a role common to some of the pro-apoptotic  Bcl-2 proteins containing only the BH3 domain.

The anti-apoptotic Bcl-2 proteins, including Bcl-2 itself, can bind BID and inhibit BID's ability to activate Bax. As a result, the anti-apoptotic Bcl-2 proteins may inhibit apoptosis by sequestering BID, leading to reduced Bax activation.

The expression of BID is upregulated by the tumor suppressor p53, and BID has been shown to be involved in p53-mediated apoptosis. The p53 protein is a transcription factor that, when activated as part of the cell's response to stress, regulates many downstream target genes, including BID. However, p53 also has a transcription-independent role in apoptosis. In particular, p53 interacts with Bax, promoting Bax activation and the insertion of Bax into the mitochondrial membrane.

The BH3 interacting-domain death agonist has been shown to interact with:
 ATR/ATRIP, 
 BCL2, 
 CASP2, 
 CASP8,
 MCL1,  and
 RPA.

Cleavage

Several reports have demonstrated that caspase-8, and its substrate BID, are frequently activated in response to certain apoptotic stimuli in a death receptor-independent manner. N-hydroxy-L-arginine (NOHA), a stable intermediate product formed during the conversion of L-arginine to nitric oxide activates caspase-8. Activation of caspase-8, and subsequent BID cleavage  participate in cytochrome-c mediated apoptosis. 1-methyl-4-phenyl-1,2,3,6-tetrahydropyridine (MPTP) mediated activation of caspase-9 via cytochrome-c release has been shown to result in the activation of caspase-8 and Bid cleavage. Aspirin and Curcumin (diferuloylmethane) too activate caspase-8 to cleave and translocate Bid, induced a conformational change in and translocation of Bax and cytochrome-c release.

See also

References

External links
 

Apoptosis
Programmed cell death
Proteins